This is a list of people executed in the United States in 2011. Forty-three people were executed in the United States in 2011, all by lethal injection. Fifteen of them were in the state of Texas. One (Humberto Leal Garcia) was a foreign national from Mexico, while another (Manuel Valle) was a foreign national from Cuba.

List of people executed in the United States in 2011

Demographics

Executions in recent years

See also
 List of death row inmates in the United States
 List of most recent executions by jurisdiction
 List of people scheduled to be executed in the United States

References

List of people executed in the United States
executed
People executed in the United States
2011